Alexandra Vasiliyevna Rodionova (born 2 January 1984) is a  Russian bobsledder and former luger who has competed since 2003. Competing in two Winter Olympics, she earned her best finish of sixth in the women's singles event at Vancouver in 2010.

Rodionova's best finish at the FIL World Luge Championships was 11th in the women's singles event at Lake Placid, New York in 2009. Her best finish at the FIL European Luge Championships was ninth in the women's singles event at Sigulda in 2010.

References
 2006 luge women's singles results
 
 IBSF-bobsleigh profile
 The-sports.org profile

External links
 
 

1984 births
Living people
Russian female lugers
Russian female bobsledders
Olympic lugers of Russia
Olympic bobsledders of Russia
Lugers at the 2006 Winter Olympics
Lugers at the 2010 Winter Olympics
Bobsledders at the 2018 Winter Olympics
People from Bratsk
Sportspeople from Irkutsk Oblast